Manuel Menezes ICS (15 February 1922 – 15 June 1996), was an Indian business executive, chairman of the Indian Railway Board. Menezes was a Goan engineer, who worked for India's Railway Board, eventually rising to be chairman, and holding the rank of a principal secretary in the Indian Civil Service.

Manuel Menezes was born in Goa, his parents hailed from Bardez, Goa. He had four children, Michael Menezes, Marisa Mascarenhas, Ivan Menezes, CEO of Diageo, and Victor Menezes, former senior vice chairman of Citigroup. He died on 15 June 1996.

References

1922 births
1996 deaths
Engineers from Goa
Indian business executives